Fred McNair and Sherwood Stewart defeated Brian Gottfried and Raúl Ramírez in the final, 6–3, 5–7, 5–7, 6–4, 6–4 to win the doubles tennis title at the 1976 Masters Grand Prix.

Juan Gisbert Sr. and Manuel Orantes were the defending champions, but were defeated in the semifinals by McNair and Stewart.

Knockout stage

Draw

References
1976 Masters-Doubles

Doubles